The uMngeni Local Municipality council consists of twenty-five members elected by mixed-member proportional representation. Twelve councilors are elected by first-past-the-post voting in twelve wards, while the remaining are chosen from party lists so that the total number of party representatives is proportional to the number of votes received.

The African National Congress (ANC) won a majority in each of the 2000, 2006, 2011 and 2016 elections, while in the 2021 South African municipal elections the Democratic Alliance (DA) won a majority of thirteen seats in the council.

Results 
The following table shows the composition of the council after past elections.

December 2000 election
The following table shows the results of the 2006 election.

March 2006 election

The following table shows the results of the 2006 election.

May 2011 election

The following table shows the results of the 2011 election.

August 2016 election

The following table shows the results of the 2016 election.

November 2021 election

The following table shows the results of the 2021 election.

References

uMngeni
Elections in KwaZulu-Natal